The National Day Parade in Qatar is held annually on the occasion of Qatar National Day on 18 December. The holiday was established on 21 June 2007 by decree of the then Crown Prince Sheikh Tamim bin Hamad Al Thani. The primary participants in the parade come from the Qatar Armed Forces, the Internal Security Force, the Ministry of Interior, and Amiri Guard. So far, there have been 12 editions of the parade. The parade goes through the Doha Corniche as well as between the Qatar National Theater and the Emiri Diwan.

Dignitaries in attendance
Emir of Qatar
His Highness the Father Emir (if there is one)
Prime Minister of Qatar
Speaker of the Shura Council
Chairman of the Consultative Assembly of Qatar
Cabinet of Qatar
Military commanders
Foreign diplomats

Parades by year

2016 – The parade was cancelled in accordance with a government order that it would cancel all festivities in solidarity with the people of the Syrian city of Aleppo following the end of the Battle of Aleppo in the Syrian Civil War.
2017 – The 10th anniversary of the parade's inception was marked with the a break in precedent by it being held in the afternoon instead of the morning. The soldiers on parade adopted the Chinese marching style which was the result of the training by members of the Beijing Garrison Honor Guard Battalion of the People's Liberation Army of China. Previously, the parade had followed British Army Chinese made guided ballistic missile launchers were also showcased.
2018 – The parade was the largest in Qatari history. The participation of military units in the parade was threefold. 90% of the weaponry seen at the parade was new according to the Commander of the Military Parade Center. This caused it to be extended form the usual 17 minute parade to around 45 minutes. The parade was held with the attendance of Turkey's Defense Minister Hulusi Akar. The Mehter Troop of the Turkish Armed Forces also participated. A band from the Italian Carabinieri was also present.
2019 – The parachute jumping ceremony was cancelled due to the inclement weather. It was the first parade since the opening of Doha Metro, which contributed to travel to the venue.
2020 – It was held amid the COVID-19 pandemic, with only the families of the health sector workers being allowed to attend.

See also
Military parades in Azerbaijan
Battle Parade
Trooping of the Colour

References

Military parades
Military of Qatar